The tufted pygmy squirrel (Exilisciurus whiteheadi) is a species of rodent in the family Sciuridae. It is endemic to highland forest in Borneo. The common name of this tiny squirrel refers to its distinctive ear-tufts. Its diet consists mainly of the lichens and mosses which cover the trees it inhabits.

References

Thorington, R. W. Jr. and R. S. Hoffman. 2005. Family Sciuridae. pp. 754–818 in Mammal Species of the World a Taxonomic and Geographic Reference. D. E. Wilson and D. M. Reeder eds. Johns Hopkins University Press, Baltimore.

Exilisciurus
Rodents of Southeast Asia
Rodents of Malaysia
Rodents of Indonesia
Mammals of Brunei
Endemic fauna of Borneo
Least concern biota of Asia
Taxonomy articles created by Polbot
Mammals described in 1887
Taxa named by Oldfield Thomas